Rincón de Valentín is a hamlet (caserío	) in the Salto Department of northwestern Uruguay.

Rincón de Valentín is also the name of the municipality to which the hamlet belongs.

Geography

Population
In 2011 Rincón de Valentín had a population of 481.

 
Source: Instituto Nacional de Estadística de Uruguay

References

External links
INE map of Rincón de Valentín

Populated places in the Salto Department